Xanthophyllum pedicellatum is a plant in the family Polygalaceae. The specific epithet  is from the Latin, referring to the long pedicel (flower stem).

Description
The smooth bark is greyish or greenish. The flowers are pinkish, drying orange-red.

Distribution and habitat
Xanthophyllum pedicellatum is endemic to Borneo. Its habitat is lowland forest and swampy terrain from sea-level to  altitude.

References

pedicellatum
Endemic flora of Borneo
Plants described in 1982